Salisbury Cathedral, formally the Cathedral Church of the Blessed Virgin Mary, is an Anglican cathedral in Salisbury, England. The cathedral is the mother church of the Diocese of Salisbury and is the seat of the Bishop of Salisbury.

The building is regarded as one of the leading examples of Early English Gothic architecture. Its main body was completed in 38 years, from 1220 to 1258.

The spire was built in 1320. Visitors can take the "Tower Tour", in which the interior of the hollow spire, with its ancient wooden scaffolding, can be viewed. It contains a clock which is among the oldest working examples in the world, and has one of the four surviving original copies of Magna Carta. In 2008, the cathedral celebrated the 750th anniversary of its consecration.

History

Possibly as a response to deteriorating relations between the clergy and the military at Old Sarum Cathedral, the decision was taken to re-site the cathedral, with the seat of the bishopric being moved to New Sarum, or Salisbury. The move occurred during the tenure of Richard Poore, the cathedral's bishop.

Construction was paid for by donations, principally from the canons and vicars of southeast England, who were asked to contribute a fixed annual sum until the building was completed. A legend tells that the Bishop of Old Sarum, Richard Poore, shot an arrow in the direction he would build the cathedral; the arrow hit a deer, which died in the place where Salisbury Cathedral is now.

The foundation stones were laid on 28 April 1220 by William Longespée, 3rd Earl of Salisbury and by Ela of Salisbury, 3rd Countess of Salisbury. Much of the freestone for the cathedral came from the Teffont Evias Quarry. The only major sections begun later were the cloisters, added in 1240, the chapter house in 1263, the tower and spire, which at  dominated the skyline from 1320. Because most of the cathedral was built in only 38 years, it has a single consistent architectural style, Early English Gothic. In total, 70,000 tons of stone, 3,000 tons of timber and 450 tons of lead were used in the construction of the cathedral.

Although the spire is the cathedral's most impressive feature, it has proved troublesome. Together with the tower, it added 6,397 tons (6,500 tonnes) to the weight of the building. Without the addition of buttresses, bracing arches and anchor irons over the succeeding centuries, it would have suffered the fate of spires on other great ecclesiastical buildings (such as Malmesbury Abbey, 1180 to 1500; Lincoln Cathedral, 1311 to 1548; Old St Paul's Cathedral, London, 1314 to 1561; and Chichester Cathedral, 1402 to 1861) and fallen down; instead, Salisbury became the tallest church spire in the country on the collapse at St Paul's (as the result of a fire) in 1561. The large supporting pillars at the corners of the spire are seen to bend inwards under the stress. The addition of reinforcing tie-beams above the crossing, designed by Christopher Wren in 1668, halted further deformation. The beams were hidden by a false ceiling installed below the lantern stage of the tower.

Salisbury is one of only three English cathedrals to lack a ring of bells, the others being Norwich Cathedral and Ely Cathedral. However, its medieval clock does strike the time with bells every 15 minutes.

21st century 
In February 2016, the cathedral chapter placed Sophie Ryder's sculpture The Kiss straddling a path on the grounds where it was to remain until July. After only a few days, the work had to be moved, as pedestrians kept bumping into it while texting.

On 25 October 2018, there was an attempted theft of the cathedral's copy of Magna Carta; the alarms were triggered and a 45-year-old man was later detained on suspicion of attempted theft, criminal damage and possession of an offensive weapon. The outer layer of a double-layered glass case containing the document was broken, but the document suffered no damage. In January 2020 the perpetrator, Mark Royden, aged 47, from Kent, was found guilty of the attempted theft, which caused £14,466 of damage, and guilty of criminal damage.

From 16 January 2021, while closed to services during the COVID-19 pandemic, the cathedral was used to accommodate the vaccination programme in the United Kingdom, a day after Lichfield Cathedral became the first place of worship to become part of the immunisation plan against the pandemic in England. A selection of music was played on the organ as people received their vaccinations.

Building and architecture

West front

The west front is of the screen-type, clearly deriving from that at Wells. It is composed of a stair turret at each extremity, with two niched buttresses nearer the centre line supporting the large central triple window. The stair turrets are topped with spirelets, and the central section is topped by a gable which contains four lancet windows topped by two round quatrefoil windows surmounted by a mandorla containing Christ in Majesty. At ground level there is a principal door flanked by two smaller doors. The whole is highly decorated with quatrefoil motifs, columns, trefoil motifs and bands of diapering.

The west front was almost certainly constructed at the same time as the cathedral. This is apparent from the way in which the windows coincide with the interior spaces. It lacks full-scale towers and/or spires as can be seen, for example at Wells, Lincoln, Lichfield, etc. The facade was disparaged by Alec Clifton-Taylor, who considered it the least successful of the English screen facades and a travesty of its prototype (Wells). He found the composition to be uncoordinated, and the Victorian statuary "poor and insipid".

The front accommodates over 130 shallow niches of varying sizes, 73 of which contain a statue. The line of niches extends round the turrets to the north, south and east faces. There are five levels of niches (not including the mandorla) which show, from the top, angels and archangels, Old Testament patriarchs, apostles and evangelists, martyrs, doctors and philosophers and, on the lower level, royalty, priests and worthy people connected with the cathedral. The majority of the statues were placed during the middle of the 19th century, however seven are from the 14th century and several have been installed within the last decade.

Nave

Salisbury Cathedral is unusual for its tall and narrow nave, which has visual accentuation from the use of light grey Chilmark stone for the walls and dark polished Purbeck marble for the columns. It has three levels: a tall pointed arcade, an open gallery and a small clerestory. Lined up between the pillars are notable tombs such as that of William Longespée, half brother of King John and the illegitimate son of Henry II, who was the first person to be buried in the cathedral.

Another unusual feature of the nave is an unconventional modern font, installed in September 2008. Designed by the water sculptor William Pye, it is the largest working font in any British cathedral, and replaced an earlier portable neo-Gothic Victorian font. The font is cruciform in shape, and has a 10-foot-wide vessel filled to its brim with water, designed so that the water overflows in filaments through each corner into bronze gratings embedded in the cathedral's stone floor. The project cost £180,000 and was funded entirely by donations. Some parishioners reportedly objected to the new font, considering it 'change for change's sake', although Pye argued that the majority opinion was in favour: "I would say 90 per cent are in happy anticipation, five per cent are nervously expectant and five per cent are probably apoplectic".

Chapter house and Magna Carta

The chapter house is notable for its octagonal shape, slender central pillar and decorative medieval frieze. It was redecorated in 1855–9 by William Burges. The frieze, which circles the interior above the stalls, depicts scenes and stories from the books of Genesis and Exodus, including Adam and Eve, Noah, the Tower of Babel, and Abraham, Isaac and Jacob.

The chapter house displays the best-preserved of the four surviving original copies of Magna Carta. This copy came to Salisbury because Elias of Dereham, who was present at Runnymede in 1215, was given the task of distributing some of the original copies. Elias later became a canon of Salisbury and supervised the construction of the cathedral.

Clock 

The Salisbury Cathedral clock, which dates from about AD 1386, is supposedly the oldest working modern clock in the world. The clock has no face; all clocks of that date rang out the hours on a bell. It was originally located in a bell tower that was demolished in 1792. Following this demolition, the clock was moved to the Cathedral Tower, where it was in operation until 1884. The clock was then placed in storage and forgotten until it was discovered in an attic of the cathedral in 1928. It was repaired and restored to working order in 1956. In 2007, remedial work and repairs were carried out.

Depictions in art, literature and television

The cathedral is the subject of a famous painting by John Constable. As a gesture of appreciation for John Fisher, Bishop of Salisbury, who commissioned this painting, Constable included the bishop and his wife in the canvas (bottom left). The view depicted in the paintings has changed very little in almost two centuries.

The cathedral is apparently the inspiration for William Golding's novel The Spire, in which the fictional Dean Jocelin makes the building of a cathedral spire his life's work. The construction of the cathedral is an important plot point in Edward Rutherfurd's historical novel Sarum, which explores the historical settlement of the Salisbury area. The cathedral has been mentioned by the author Ken Follett as one of two models for the fictional Kingsbridge Cathedral in his historical novel The Pillars of the Earth. It was also used for some external shots in the 2010 miniseries based on Follett's book and was shown as it is today in the final scene.  Another mention of this cathedral was made by Jonathan Swift in The Travels of Gulliver, part II, chapter IV, making a comparison between its spire and the tower of the main temple of Lorbrulgrud, Brobdingnag's capital. In 1990, Channel 4 marked the official launch of its NICAM stereo service with a live broadcast of Mahler's 9th Symphony from the cathedral. The cathedral was the setting for the 2005 BBC television drama Mr. Harvey Lights a Candle, written by Rhidian Brook and directed by Susanna White. Kevin McCloud climbed the cathedral in his programme called Don't Look Down! in which he climbed high structures to conquer his fear of heights. The cathedral was the subject of a Channel 4 Time Team programme which was first broadcast on 8 February 2009.

Dean and chapter
As of 1 January 2021:
Dean – Nicholas Papadopulos (since 9 September 2018 installation)
Canon Precentor – Anna Macham (since 5 May 2019 installation)
Canon Chancellor – Ed Probert (since 4 April 2004 installation)
Canon Treasurer – Robert Titley (since November 2015 installation)

Burials

Notable burials include:
William Longespée, 3rd Earl of Salisbury, ( 1165–1226)
Lady Katherine Grey, Countess of Hertford (1540–1568)
Saint Osmund, Bishop of Salisbury (1078–1099)
Roger of Salisbury, Bishop of Salisbury (1102–1139)
Josceline de Bohon, Bishop of Salisbury (1142–1184)
Robert de Bingham, Bishop of Salisbury (1229–1246)
Giles of Bridport, Bishop of Salisbury (1256–1262)
Walter de la Wyle, Bishop of Salisbury (1263–1271)
Nicholas Longespee, Bishop of Salisbury (1291–1297)
Simon of Ghent, Bishop of Salisbury (1297–1315)
Roger Martival, Bishop of Salisbury (1315–1330)
Walter Hungerford, 1st Baron Hungerford (1378–1449)
Richard Mitford, Bishop of Salisbury (1395–1407)
Robert Hungerford, 2nd Baron Hungerford (1409-1459)
Robert Hungerford, Lord Moleyns and 3rd Baron Hungerford (1431–1464)
John Cheyne, Baron Cheyne ( 1442–1499)
Richard Beauchamp, Bishop of Salisbury (1450–1482)
John Blyth, Bishop of Salisbury (1493–1499)
John Doget,  Renaissance humanist (died 1501)
Edmund Audley, Bishop of Salisbury (1501–1524)
Edward Seymour, 1st Earl of Hertford (1539–1621), nephew of queen-consort Jane Seymour
Thomas Gorges, (1536–1610) and wife Helena, Marchioness of Northampton, (1548/1549–1635)
John Jewel, Bishop of Salisbury (1559–1571)
Edmund Gheast, Bishop of Salisbury (1571–1577)
Mary Sidney (1561–1621), writer and patron
William Herbert, 3rd Earl of Pembroke (1580–1630), politician and courtier, buried in a family vault in front of the altar.
Philip Herbert, 4th Earl of Pembroke
Philip Herbert, 7th Earl of Pembroke
Michael Wise (1648–1687), organist and composer
Alexander Hyde, Bishop of Salisbury (1665–1667)
John Seymour, 4th Duke of Somerset (before 1646–1675)
Charles Seymour, 6th Duke of Somerset in the Seymour Chapel (1662–1748)
John Thomas, Bishop of Salisbury (1761–1766)
Edward Heath, former British Prime Minister (1970-1974)

Music

Organ
Throughout its history, there have been several organs in the cathedral. Of particular interest are the two fine four-manual instruments, the first by Renatus Harris (c. 1652–1724), which was replaced at the end of the 18th century, and the current organ, whose present fame has eclipsed the reputation of the former.

The four-manual instrument by Harris had been installed in 1710. The abundance of reed stops was typical of Harris' instruments and bears witness to the influence of the classical French organ. The instrument, not only spectacular in style but also of good quality, had remained practically unaltered (beyond occasional repairs) for nearly 80 years, until it was replaced at the same time as the cathedral was "restored" by James Wyatt between 1789 and 1792: the Bishop had convinced George III to furnish the cathedral with a new instrument once the work was complete.

This organ, by Samuel Green, was presented by the king in 1792 and was installed on top of the stone screen, which, unusually, did not divide the choir from the nave, but rather came from an unknown location in the cathedral. The organ was later taken out and moved to St Thomas's Church. When the new Willis organ was installed, its distinct sound from 55 powerfully-voiced stops, directly in the choir with little casework, was quite a contrast to Green's more gentle 23-stop instrument.

The present-day instrument was built in 1877 by Henry Willis & Sons. Walter Alcock, who was organist of the cathedral from 1916, oversaw a strictly faithful restoration of the famous Father Willis organ, completed in 1934, even going to such lengths as to refuse to allow parts of the instrument to leave the cathedral in case any unauthorised tonal alterations were made without his knowledge, while allowing some discrete additions in the original style of the organ (as well as modernisation of the organ's actions) by Henry Willis III, the grandson of Father Willis. The instrument was extensively restored between 2019 and 2020.

Organists

It is recorded that in 1463 John Kegewyn was organist of Salisbury Cathedral. Among the notable organists of more recent times have been a number of composers and well-known performers including Bertram Luard-Selby, Charles Frederick South, Walter Alcock, David Valentine Willcocks, Douglas Albert Guest, Christopher Dearnley, Richard Godfrey Seal and the BBC presenter Simon Lole.

Choir
Salisbury Cathedral Choir holds annual auditions for boys and girls aged 7–9 years old for scholarships to Salisbury Cathedral School, which housed in the former Bishop's Palace.  The boys' choir and the girls' choir (each 16 strong) sing alternate daily Evensong and Sunday Matins and Eucharist services throughout the school year. There are also many additional services during the Christian year particularly during Advent, Christmas, Holy Week, and Easter.  The Advent From Darkness to Light services are the best known. Choristers come from across the country and some board. Six lay vicars (adult men) comprise the rest of the choir, singing tenor, alto and bass parts. In 1993, the cathedral was the venue for the first broadcast of Choral Evensong (the long-running BBC Radio 3 programme) to be sung by a girls' cathedral choir.

Cathedral constables
The cathedral previously employed five cathedral constables (known as "Close Constables"), whose duties mainly concerned the maintenance of law and order in the cathedral close. They were made redundant in 2010 as part of cost-cutting measures and replaced with "traffic managers".

The constables were first appointed when the cathedral became a liberty in 1611 and survived until the introduction of municipal police forces in 1835 with the Municipal Corporations Act. In 1800 they were given the power, along with the city constables, to execute any justices' or court orders requiring the conveyance of prisoners to or from the county jail (at Fisherton Anger, then outside the city of Salisbury) as if it were the city jail (and, in so doing, they were made immune from any legal action for acting outside their respective jurisdictions). The right of the cathedral, as a liberty, to maintain a separate police force was conclusively terminated by the Local Government Act 1888.

Peregrine falcons
Between 1864 and 1953, there were records of peregrine falcons being present at the cathedral. More arrived in 2013, and have been hatching every year since, with their nests on the cathedral's tower.

Gallery

See also 

 Salisbury Cathedral School
 Bishop Wordsworth's School
 Gothic cathedrals and churches
 List of Gothic cathedrals in Europe
 Architecture of the medieval cathedrals of England
 English Gothic architecture
 List of cathedrals in the United Kingdom
 List of tallest churches
 List of tallest structures built before the 20th century

References

Notes

Citations

Bibliography

 Evans, Sydney. Salisbury Cathedral: A reflective Guide, Michael Russell Publishing, Salisbury. 1985.
 Martín-Gil, J; Martín-Gil, FJ; Ramos-Sánchez, MC; Martín-Ramos, P. The Orange-Brown Patina of Salisbury Cathedral (West Porch) Surfaces: Evidence of its Man-Made Origin. Environmental Science and Pollution Research, 12(5):285–289. 2005.

External links

 
Salisbury Cathedral Stained Glass website 
Adrian Fletcher's Paradoxplace — Salisbury Cathedral and Magna Carta
Sarum Use at OrthodoxWiki
A history of the choir
Flickr images
Salisbury official tourism website

 
Buildings and structures completed in 1258
13th-century church buildings in England
Anglican cathedrals in England
Church of England church buildings in Wiltshire
Tourist attractions in Wiltshire
Grade I listed churches in Wiltshire
Grade I listed cathedrals
English Gothic architecture in Wiltshire
Churches in Salisbury
Anglo-Catholic church buildings in Wiltshire
Pre-Reformation Roman Catholic cathedrals
Diocese of Salisbury
Basilicas (Church of England)